Sporting Blood may refer to:

 Sporting Blood (1931 film)
 Sporting Blood (1940 film)
 Sporting Blood, a race horse that won the 1921 Travers Stakes under suspicious circumstances, owned by Arnold Rothstein